Daniel Ohrn (born January 27, 1993) is a Swedish ice hockey player. He is currently playing with Tingsyds Aif in the hockeyallsvenskan |].

References

External links

1993 births
Living people
Swedish ice hockey centres
Timrå IK players
People from Sundsvall
Sportspeople from Västernorrland County